Damir Vitas  (born 11 March 1981) is a Croatian-Macedonian retired footballer who last played for SC Schönau.

Club career
Vitas previously played for Serbian club FK Radnički Bajmok, Macedonian FK Sileks and NK Međimurje in the Croatian First League. Later he played for Ljungskile SK in Sweden, and Thrasyvoulos in Greece. and Pfaffstätten and Schonau in Austria.

References

External links
 

1981 births
Living people
Association football central defenders
Macedonian footballers
Croatian footballers
FK Sileks players
NK Međimurje players
Ljungskile SK players
Thrasyvoulos F.C. players
Macedonian First Football League players
Croatian Football League players
Allsvenskan players
Austrian 2. Landesliga players
Croatian expatriate footballers
Expatriate footballers in Serbia and Montenegro
Croatian expatriate sportspeople in Serbia and Montenegro
Expatriate footballers in North Macedonia
Croatian expatriate sportspeople in North Macedonia
Expatriate footballers in Sweden
Croatian expatriate sportspeople in Sweden
Expatriate footballers in Greece
Croatian expatriate sportspeople in Greece
Expatriate footballers in Austria
Croatian expatriate sportspeople in Austria